This is a complete list of state prisons in Utah. There are no federal prisons in Utah and this list does not include county jails located in the state of Utah.

As of 2010, Utah eliminated its use of private prisons for state prisoners.

Facilities 

 Central Utah Correctional Facility, Gunnison
 Utah State Correctional Facility, Salt Lake City

Closed 
 Sugar House Prison, Salt Lake City (closed 1951)
 Utah State Prison, Draper (closed 2022)

See also
List of United States state prisons

References

External links
Utah Department of Corrections

 
Utah
Prisons